The Simpsons: Tapped Out is a freemium city-building mobile game for iOS and Android, based on the American animated series The Simpsons. It allows users to create and maintain their own version of Springfield using familiar characters and buildings. The game is regularly updated with new content, often season and holiday themed, for example during holidays like Thanksgiving, and Treehouse of Horror episodes-related content for Halloween. The game is available in several languages such as English, French, Turkish, Italian, German,  Simplified Chinese, Peninsular Spanish and both European Portuguese and Brazilian Portuguese. The game was developed and published by EA Mobile and launched in Europe on February 29, 2012 and in North America on March 1, 2012 for iOS and February 6, 2013 for Android. The game was released for Kindle Fire devices in several markets on June 24, 2013.

According to its own estimates, EA generated over $130 million in revenue since the game's release, . , the game has received 80million downloads and grossed .

Story
Too busy playing an elf-related game on his myPad (parody of iPad) at work, Homer Simpson neglects his workstation and accidentally causes a meltdown at the nuclear power plant, leading to a complete destruction of Springfield. Left stranded, he is solely responsible for rebuilding Springfield and bringing back its town members. Homer is desperate to find other characters so that he can get them to rebuild and he can get back to his elf game. With the help of Lisa, Homer rebuilds Springfield and brings back key sought-out characters.

Gameplay

The game may be considered a city-building game. It offers a variety of buildings (houses, shops, public buildings from the animation series) that the player buys with "Money ($)" in-game currency. Premium items are bought with donuts which can also be purchased with real-world cash. This references Homer Simpson's passion for donuts within the series. The player uses building and character quest-lines to make in-game progress. By completing quests and levels, the player collects more characters and buildings unlocking further quests and levels. Each building regularly generates in-game money to collect, under names such as "Income tax" from houses and the "Collection plate" from the First Church of Springfield. Players can place rivers, roads, pavement and decorations on the land. In 2013, developers added the "Krustyland" transporter, to get players from Springfield to the infamous Krustyland, where they can expand and build like the main Springfield game.

The game is supported by EA's Origin, which acts as a social bridge to where players log into their Origin accounts and visit friends' towns to collect cash once every 24 hours; and occasionally other tasks during an event.

Since the May 18, 2016 update, the maximum number of levels is counted to 939, because this is the Simpsons' area code in Springfield.

Frequent content updates have been released for the game, with new game content or time-limited events related to episode promotions or holidays. Major events include a temporary currency, which can be used to buy – or win – limited edition prizes. For some events every user's winnings contributed to a community fund, which includes prizes for certain levels of the event currency.

Characters and cast
Dan Castellaneta – Homer Simpson, Abraham Simpson, Joe Quimby, Groundskeeper Willie, Krusty the Clown, various characters
Julie Kavner – Marge Simpson, Patty Bouvier, Selma Bouvier & Jacqueline Bouvier
Nancy Cartwright – Bart Simpson, Maggie Simpson, Nelson Muntz, Ralph Wiggum, various characters
Yeardley Smith – Lisa Simpson
Hank Azaria – Moe Szyslak, Chief Wiggum, Apu Nahasapeemapetilon, Professor Frink, Cletus Spuckler, various characters
Harry Shearer – Mr. Burns, Waylon Smithers, Kent Brockman, Ned Flanders, various characters
Matt Groening – Himself

Development
According to game runner and longtime Simpsons writer J. Stewart Burns, the game originally started as a "labor of love" and he didn't expect much to happen after the game's release. Although they do not get credited, there are about ten writers who currently work on the game, including Simpsons writers Burns, Matt Selman, Brian Kelley, Jeff Westbrook, Jon Kern, Carolyn Omine and Diana Wright.

In-game problems
Shortly after the iOS launch, the game was pulled from the iOS App Store due to EA's servers being unable to cope with the demand and a plethora of serious glitches reported by users. After a month had passed, EA set up a forum whereby users could report bug issues, but failed to offer solutions to issues or temporary updates. Some users who had made in-app purchases discovered that their purchases had vanished. After contacting EA, users were able to collect refunds directly from Apple. Several months later on August 16, 2012, the app returned to the App Store.

Reception 
The game has a score of 69 out of 100 on Metacritic, indicating "Mixed or average reviews". Daniel Bischoff from GameRevolution summarized their review by saying, "The Simpsons has everything you need for an excellent free-to-play game, including universal appeal, a wealth of material, and excellent little sound bytes like "D'oh" and Krusty's iconic laugh. It's just a shame that Electronics Arts has to choke the life out of that wonder with their oppressive Origin service". Max Eddy from PCMag described the game as "[walking] a delicate line between miserable money-maker and actual entertainment. So far it's done a good job being fun, but it's a balance that's easily upset".

Criticism

Due to criticism of the larger trend of freemium games' revenue structure, the game was satirized in the South Park episode "Freemium Isn't Free" as exploitative and lacking in gameplay.  The game itself earlier lampooned this point during an in-game conversation between two characters. In The Simpsons season 25 episode "Labor Pains", Homer opens the game on his phone and is automatically charged $300.

Accolades
The game won the People's Voice Award for "Strategy/Simulation" at the 2018 Webby Awards.

See also

List of The Simpsons video games
Family Guy: The Quest for Stuff
Futurama: Worlds of Tomorrow

References

External links
The Simpsons: Tapped Out at Electronic Arts

2012 video games
IOS games
Android (operating system) games
Metafictional video games
City-building games
Video games based on The Simpsons
Video games developed in the United States
Video games about parallel universes
Video games set in amusement parks
Multiplayer and single-player video games